Esperanza is the eighth studio album by the German solo artist Michael Rother. It was released on 11 March 1996. Excepting 1993's compilation album Radio, the studio album was Rother's first since 1987 and his sole full release of material in the 1990s.

The album was recorded between January 1995 and January 1996 in Germany at Rother's own studio Random Studio in Forst and Studio B3, Hamburg. Additional recording and digital treatments took place at Alphaton Studio, Wentorf in December 1995 and January 1996. Receiving positive reviews the album was released as an CD and limited edition double LP in 1996 before it was re-released in 2000. The artwork and photography and for the album was designed and shot by Thomas Beckmann.

Recording and music
Esperanza was recorded and produced by Rother with only a small amount of assistance. This was in contrast to the majority of his 1980s work which Rother recorded alone. Jens Harke provided vocals and wrote the lyrics for "Weil Schnee und Eis", aside from the vocal samples on "Die Ganze Welt (World Mix)" (from Radio), the appearance of vocals on the song was a first for Rother's solo work. Joachim Rudolph contributed to the album in his programming of Pro Tools and DD-1000 computer software. The rest of the album was written and performed by Rother utilising electronic instrumentation. The entire album was digitally treated at Alphaton Studio, Wentorf along with additional recording on "Electra".

Releases
Esperanza was first released on Random Records as CD and as double LP on 11 March 1996. The double LP was pressed on 150 gram and limited to 1000 copies, it includes bonus tracks dating from the sessions that produced the bonus tracks on Rother's 1993 re-issue campaign. The tracks included are "Nachtpassage (Chill Remix)", "Unterwasserwolken",  "Südseewellen (Ambient Remix - 1993)" and "Nachtpassage (Ambient Night Mix)" In 2000, Rother re-issued all of the albums, including Esperanza, in partnership between Random Records and BSC Music.

Reception

Esperanza received positive reviews by the majority of critics.

Track listing

Personnel
 Michael Rother - All Instruments, Electronics, Producer
 Jens Harke - Vocals ("Weil Schnee und Eis")
 Joachim Rudolph - Pro Tools, DD-1000
 Achim Kruse - Digital Mastering
 Thomas Beckmann - Cover-Design, Photography

References

1996 albums
Michael Rother albums